Watmough is a surname. Notable people with the surname include:

Anthony Watmough, Australian rugby league footballer
Chris Watmough, English cricketer
David Watmough, Canadian playwright, short story writer, and novelist
Dickie Watmough, English footballer and cricketer
John Goddard Watmough, American politician